Bomaa is a town in the Ahafo Region of Ghana. The town is known for the Bomaa Commercial Secondary School.  The school is a second cycle institution.

References

Populated places in the Ahafo Region